George McLeod may refer to:

Politics
 George McLeod (New Brunswick politician) (1836–1905), Canadian Member of Parliament for Kent
 George McLeod (British Columbia politician) (1896–1965), Canadian Member of Parliament for Okanagan—Revelstoke
 George Malcolm McLeod (born 1946), politician in Saskatchewan, Canada
 George McLeod (Australian politician) (1884–1919), Australian trade unionist and politician

Sports
 George McLeod (basketball) (1931–2023), basketball player active in the 1950s
 George McLeod (footballer, born 1871) (1871–1921), Australian rules footballer for St Kilda
 George McLeod (footballer, born 1879) (1879–1959), Australian rules footballer for St Kilda and Essendon
 George McLeod (footballer, born 1932) (1932–2016), Scottish footballer
George McCloud (born 1967), American basketball player active in the 1990s

Other
 Sir George Husband Baird MacLeod (1828–1892), physician to Queen Victoria in Scotland
 George MacLeod (1895–1991), Scottish soldier and clergyman